Alde Leie is a village in the municipality of Leeuwarden, province of Friesland) in the Netherlands. It had a population of around 255 in January 2017. A small part of the village lays within the municipality Waadhoeke. 

It is on the route of the Elfstedentocht. There is a windmill in the vicinity, De Balkendsterpoldermolen.

History
The village was first mentioned in 1466 as "op ter Leya", and means old dug canal. Alde Leie developed as a dike village along the Middelzee. In 1840, it was home to 339 people. In 1868, a church was built.

Before 2018, the village was part of the Leeuwarderadeel municipality.

Gallery

References

External links

Leeuwarden
Waadhoeke
Populated places in Friesland